John Russell, 1st Earl of Bedford  ( 1485 – 14 March 1555) was an English royal minister in the Tudor era. He served variously as Lord High Admiral and Lord Privy Seal. Among the lands and property he was given by Henry VIII after the Dissolution of the Monasteries, were the Abbey and town of Tavistock, and the area that is now Covent Garden. Russell is the ancestor of all subsequent Earls and Dukes of Bedford and Earls Russell, including John Russell, Prime Minister of the United Kingdom, and philosopher Bertrand Russell.

Origins
John Russell was born c. 1485 probably at Berwick-by-Swyre, Dorset, the son of Sir James Russell (d. Nov. 1505) and his first wife Alice Wyse, daughter of Thomas Wyse of Sidenham, near Tavistock, Devon. James's father was possibly Sir William Russell, but more likely his brother John Russell (d. pre-November, 1505) by his wife Alice Froxmere, daughter of John Froxmere of Droitwich, Worcestershire, because his coat of arms quarters Froxmere. The elder John Russell was the son of Sir Henry Russell (d. 1463/4), and Elizabeth Herring, daughter of John Herring of Chaldon Herring. Henry, a great-grandfather of the 1st earl, was a substantial wine merchant and shipper, who represented Weymouth in the House of Commons four times.

The Russell pedigree can only be traced back with certainty to Henry Russell's father, Sir Stephen Russell, the evidence being contained in a deed of April 1440 in which Henry Russell made over to his daughter Christina and her husband Walter Cheverell of Chauntemarle, a tenement in Dorchester to be held of himself and his heirs upon the rent of a red rose. In the deed, Henry referred to himself as son and heir of Sir Stephen Russell and of Alice, his wife. This Alice appears to have been the heir general of the De la Tour family, which had long owned Berwick-by-Swyre, and by whom therefore the manor was brought into the Russell family.

Both Sir Henry and Sir Stephen were referred to as Gascoigne as well as Russell, possibly due to their wine trade with France, as in a 1442 pardon under the Privy Seal referring to Henry Russell of Weymouth, merchant, alias Henry Gascoign, gentleman. It was long believed in the noble Russell family, certainly by the 2nd Earl of Bedford, that the family was descended from the ancient family of Russell of Kingston Russell in Dorset, three miles north-east of Berwick, which descent was declared unproven by Gladys Scott Thomson in her Two Centuries of Family History, London, 1930, an exhaustive and scholarly work on the early pedigree of the Earls of Bedford. (For a disambiguation of the Bedford Russells and the Russells of Kingston Russell, see Kingston Russell House.)

Career
In 1506 John Russell was of service to Archduke Philip of Austria and Juana his wife (king and queen of Castile) when they were shipwrecked off Weymouth, and escorted the royal couple to the English court in London. He was one of the most accomplished gentlemen of his time and so impressed them by his gracious manners that they praised him highly to King Henry VII. He became a Gentleman of the Privy Chamber to Henry VII in 1507 and to his son and successor Henry VIII in 1509, who employed him in various military and diplomatic missions during the War of the League of Cambrai. He was at the taking of Thérouanne and Tournai. He was knighted on 2 July 1522 after losing an eye at the taking of Morlaix in Brittany, and he witnessed the Battle of Pavia.

Following his marriage in the Spring of 1526, he made alterations to his ancestral seat Chenies Manor House to reflect his new good fortunes. He now stood in favour with the king and Cardinal Wolsey, though he would not suffer disgrace at the fall of the latter.

He was made High Sheriff of Dorset and Somerset in 1528 and served as Member of Parliament for Buckinghamshire 1529–1536, retaining the royal favour despite the antipathy of Anne Boleyn. Late in 1536, he was made a Privy Counsellor, and helped to suppress the Pilgrimage of Grace.

The fall and execution of Henry Courtenay, Marquess of Exeter, left a power vacuum in the south-western counties of England, which Russell was called upon to fill. On 9 March 1538/1539 he was created Baron Russell, and appointed Lord President of the Council of the West. In the next month, he was made a Knight of the Garter. In July 1539 he was made High Steward of Cornwall, and Lord Warden of the Stannaries.

The Council of the West proved unsuccessful as an instrument of government, and did not survive the fall of Cromwell. Russell, however, remained a great magnate in the western counties, and obtained the office of Lord High Admiral in 1540. (The previous holder, the Earl of Southampton, replaced Cromwell as Lord Privy Seal.) After Henry VIII met Anne of Cleves at Rochester, the next day he asked Russell if he "thought her fair". Russell replied with his natural diplomacy and prudence that he took her "not to be fair, but of a brown complexion". In 1542, Russell himself resigned from the Admiralty and succeeded to the Privy Seal on the death of Southampton. He was High Steward of the University of Oxford from 1543 till his death.

During the Italian War of 1542, he unsuccessfully besieged Montreuil in 1544, and was Captain General of the Vanguard of the army for the attack on Boulogne in 1545. He was a close companion of King Henry VIII during the last years of his reign. On Henry's death in 1547, he was one of the executors of the king's will, and one of sixteen counsellors during the minority of his son King Edward VI.

On 21 June 1553 he was one of the twenty-six peers who signed the settlement of the crown on Lady Jane Grey. He was sent to attend King Philip II into England on his arrival from Spain to wed the Queen Mary.

Earldom
He was Lord High Steward at the Coronation of King Edward VI (1547–1553) on 20 February 1547. He was created by that young king (in practice by the Regent) Earl of Bedford on 19 January 1550 for his assistance in carrying out the order of the Council against "images" and for promoting the new religion. In 1552, he was made Lord Lieutenant of Devon.

Marriage and progeny
In the spring of 1526 he married Anne Sapcote, daughter of Sir Guy Sapcote of Huntingdonshire by his wife Margaret Wolston, and widow, successively, of John Broughton (d. 24 January 1518) of Toddington, Bedfordshire, by whom she had a son and three daughters, and, secondly, of Sir Richard Jerningham (d.1525), by whom she had no issue. By Anne Sapcote he had one child:
Francis Russell, 2nd Earl of Bedford (1527–1585), son and heir

Step-children
The issue of Anne Sapcote by her first husband John Broughton (d. 1518) were as follows:
John Broughton (d. 1528).
Katherine Broughton (d. 23 April 1533), who was the ward firstly of Cardinal Wolsey, and secondly Agnes Howard, Duchess of Norfolk, who arranged the marriage of Katherine, as his first wife, to her eldest son, William Howard, 1st Baron Howard of Effingham.
Anne Broughton (d. 16 May 1562), who married, as his second wife, by dispensation dated 24 May 1539, Sir Thomas Cheyney, Lord Warden of the Cinque Ports. There is a monument to her at Toddington.
Daughter whose name is unknown, and who died between July 1517 and 1529.

Death and burial

Russell died on 14 March 1554/5 and was buried at his ancestral manor of Chenies, Buckinghamshire, in the private Bedford Chapel of the parish church next to Chenies Manor House, his former chief residence. The Dukes of Bedford continue to be buried in this chapel.

His widow, Anne, died on 14 March 1559 and was buried at Chenies on 21 March 1559.

Succession
Russell is the ancestor of all subsequent Earls and Dukes of Bedford and Earls Russell, including John Russell, Prime Minister of the United Kingdom, and the philosopher Bertrand Russell.

Properties acquired
On the Dissolution of the Monasteries King Henry VIII granted Russell lands and properties including Tavistock Abbey and Plympton Abbey in Devon, the wealthiest two abbeys in Devon, and the Cistercian Dunkeswell Abbey also in Devon. He was granted the Blackfriars in Exeter, on the site of which he built his opulent townhouse known as Bedford House, from where he conducted his duties as Lord Lieutenant of Devon. These grants made him the largest landowner in Devon. In Bedfordshire, he acquired the site of Woburn Abbey which he made his chief seat. In London he was granted  called "Long Acre", and the kitchen garden of Westminster Abbey, which is now the site of Covent Garden. The present Duke of Bedford (or his trustees, the "Bedford trustees") retain still in 2013 several acres of prime London property comprising the Bedford Estate centred on Bedford Square and Tavistock Square.

Garter stall plate

John Russell's Garter stall plate survives affixed to the back of his stall in St George's Chapel, Windsor Castle. The shield shows quarterly of four: 1st grand quarter: quarterly 1st & 4th: Argent, a lion rampant gules on a chief sable three escallops of the first (Russell); 2nd & 3rd: Azure, a tower argent (de la Tour); 2nd Gules, three herrings hauriant argent (Herringham); 3rd Sable, a griffin segreant between three crosses crosslet fitchy argent (Froxmere); 4th: Sable, three chevronnels ermine in dexter chief a crescent or for difference (Wyse). Crest: A goat passant argent; Supporters: Dexter: A goat argent, Sinister: A lion rampant gules Motto: Plus que Jamais ("More than Never"). Inscription in French: Du tres noble et puisant Seigneur Johan Conte de Bedford Baron Russell Chevalier du tres noble Ordre de la Jarretiere et Garduen du Prive Seau, fust enstalle a Wyndsor le XVIII jure de Maye l'an du Roy Henry VIII de son reigne XXXI l'an 1539 ("Of the very noble and powerful Lord John, Earl of Bedford, Baron Russell, Knight of the Very Noble Order of the Garter and Keeper of the Privy Seal was installed at Windsor the 18th day of May the year of King Henry VIII of his reign the 31st, the year 1539").

Footnotes

References

 

. A severe and detailed critique of the work of Wiffen.
 (Includes an early pedigree of the Earls of Bedford, and builds on J. Horace Round's critique of Wiffen)
 
 Fatally flawed in its erroneous linkage of the Russell Earls of Bedford with the "baronial" Russells of Kingston Russell.

External links

Will of Lady Anne, Countess of Bedford, proved 21 March 1559, PROB 11/42A/512, National Archives Retrieved 30 May 2013
John Russell at Tudor Place

|-

|-

|-

|-

1485 births
1555 deaths

Year of birth uncertain
John
John
High Sheriffs of Somerset
High Sheriffs of Dorset
English MPs 1529–1536
Knights of the Garter
Lord High Stewards
Lord-Lieutenants of Cornwall
Lord-Lieutenants of Devon
Lord-Lieutenants of Dorset
Lord-Lieutenants of Somerset
Lords Privy Seal
Lord High Admirals of England
People from West Dorset District
J
Gentlemen of the Privy Chamber
15th-century English people
16th-century English nobility
16th-century Royal Navy personnel
Peers of England created by Henry VIII
Court of Henry VIII